Bojan Stepanović (born January 11, 1983) is a Serbian footballer who played as a midfielder.

Career

Europe
Born in Belgrade, in the Yugoslavia prior to the country's breakup in the Yugoslav wars, Stepanović spent his early career playing in his native Serbia. He was a member of the youth setup at Radnički Beograd, and played for Radnički's first team in the First League of Serbia and Montenegro in 2004. He later went on to play for Voždovac in the 2005–06 Serbia and Montenegro SuperLiga, and for Srem in the Serbian First League (Serbian second tier) from 2007 to 2009.

North America
Stepanović was signed by Chivas USA on March 27, 2009, after impressing head coach Preki during a month-long trial, in which he played in several pre-season friendlies. He made his Major League Soccer debut on March 29, 2009, coming on as a 69th-minute substitute in a 2-0 away win over FC Dallas. He scored six minutes into his debut appearance.

Stepanović was waived by Chivas USA on January 26, 2010. In 2014, he signed with Burlington SC of the Canadian Soccer League, where he played for two seasons. In 2016, he remained in the CSL and signed with Brantford Galaxy, where he appeared in 21 matches with 5 goals.

References

External links
 MLS player profile
 Short career story at Tribalfootball
 

1983 births
Living people
Footballers from Belgrade
Serbian footballers
Serbian expatriate footballers
FK Voždovac players
FK Srem players
Chivas USA players
Expatriate soccer players in the United States
NK Drava Ptuj players
Expatriate footballers in Slovenia
Association football midfielders
Major League Soccer players
FK Timok players
Canadian Soccer League (1998–present) players
Brantford Galaxy players
Halton United players